Yaqoob Salem Eid Yaqoob (born 1 March 1996 in Nigeria) is a Bahraini sprinter. He holds the national record for 200m.

Career
Yaqoob competed at the 2015 Military World Games in the 100 metres and 200 metres. He reached the final of the 100m and the semi-final of the 200m.

Yaqoob competed in the 2016 Rio Olympics, and reached the semi-finals of the 200 metres. He holds the national record having run the 200m in 20.19 seconds.

Personal bests
100 metres – 10.37 seconds (2015)
200 metres – 20.19 seconds (2016)

References

1996 births
Living people
Bahraini male sprinters
Athletes (track and field) at the 2016 Summer Olympics
Athletes (track and field) at the 2018 Asian Games
Olympic athletes of Bahrain
World Athletics Championships athletes for Bahrain
Asian Games medalists in athletics (track and field)
Asian Games bronze medalists for Bahrain
Medalists at the 2018 Asian Games